The Adocidae are an extinct family of aquatic and omnivorous turtles. They are freshwater cryptodiran turtles and are mainly known from Cretaceous and Paleogene Asia and North America.

Taxonomy
Phylogeny modified from Danilov et al. (2013). Yehguia is most likely synonymous with Sinaspideretes, and is placed outside of Adocidae here for reasons proposed in Tong, Li & Ouyang (2013).

Distribution
Species of this genus are present in Oligocene of Kazakhstan, Paleocene of United States, and the Cretaceous of Canada, Japan, Kazakhstan, Kyrgyzstan, Laos, Mexico, Mongolia, Tajikistan, Thailand, United States and Uzbekistan.

References

Paleocene Mammals
Recently Collected Specimen of Adocus
E.V. Syromyatnikova and I.G. Danilov 
Yale Digital Content

Trionychia
Extinct turtles